Coriaria is the sole genus in the family Coriariaceae, which was described by Linnaeus in 1753. It includes 14 species of small trees, shrubs and subshrubs, with a widespread but disjunct distribution across warm temperate regions of the world, occurring as far apart as the Mediterranean region, southern and eastern Asia, New Zealand (where some are alpine species), the Pacific Ocean islands, and Central and South America.

The leaves are opposite or in whorls, simple, 2–9 cm long, without stipules. The flowers are borne in racemes 2–30 cm long, each flower small, greenish, with five small petals. The fruit is a small and shiny black (occasionally yellow or red) berry-like swollen corolla, highly poisonous in several species, though those of C. terminalis are edible. At least a few members of this genus are non-legume nitrogen fixers.

The Mediterranean species C. myrtifolia is known as redoul, and the several New Zealand species are known by the Māori name of tutu.

The South American species C. ruscifolia is an evergreen climber known as deu or huique, and its fruits are used in Southern Chile to make rat poison.

Species
Coriaria comprises the following species:

Hybrids
The following hybrids have been described:
 Coriaria × sarlurida Cockayne & Allan - New Zealand 
 Coriaria × sarmangusta Allan - New Zealand

Fossil record
Coriariaceae fossils as pollen and seeds, are known from the Miocene of Europe. The discovery of pollen grains from Early Campanian (ca. 82 Mya) deposits in Antarctica, which were described as Coriaripites goodii, expand the family’s fossil record and represent the so far oldest fossil of the order Cucurbitales.

References

 
Cucurbitales genera
Taxa named by Carl Linnaeus